USS South Dakota may refer to:

 , was a  armored cruiser that escorted troops and convoys during World War I
 , her class of battleship, but canceled before launch
 , was the lead ship of her class of battleship, and saw action during World War II

See also
 South Dakota-class battleship
 South Dakota (disambiguation)

United States Navy ship names